Mohamed Adhikari is a professor of history and author of several books on both Coloured identity and politics in South Africa as well as on settler colonialism and genocide. He is a professor at the University of Cape Town. He was born in Cape Town in 1953, matriculated from Harold Cressy High School in 1971, and obtained a bachelor's degree at the University of Cape Town in 1980.

Bibliography 
 
 
 
 Against the Current: a biography of Harold Cressy, 1889–1916. Cape Town: Juta 2012 .

References 

Academic staff of the University of Cape Town
Historians of Africa
Living people
Year of birth missing (living people)